Iblin refers to 

Iblin, Syria, a village in Syria.
Ibelin, a castle and a family in the medieval Kingdom of Jerusalem.
I'billin, a village in Israel.